Josep Joan Moreso  is a Spanish former head of Pompeu Fabra University (UPF) and professor of philosophy of law.

External links
 Presentation in Universia (spanish)
 Personal website

References

Spanish philosophers
Humanities academics
Living people
1959 births
Academic staff of Pompeu Fabra University